Nuthanakalva Ramakrishna Reddy (14 January 1936 Village Kelavathi, Chittoor district (Andhra Pradesh) – 14 August 2010) was a leader of Telugu Desam Party from Andhra Pradesh.

Early life

Political career
He served as member of the Lok Sabha representing Chittoor  (Lok Sabha constituency), MLA from Punganur (Assembly constituency). He was elected to 11th, 12th and 13th Lok Sabha. He served as MLA & State Minister from Punganur (Assembly constituency) in 1985, 1989 & 1994 Assembly elections. In 1996 he resigned as MLA and contested as Lok Sabha Member for Chittoor (Lok Sabha constituency) for 11th Lok Sabha elections.

Death
He died after a prolonged illness at the age of 74.

References

India MPs 1996–1997
People from Chittoor  district
1936 births
Living people
Telugu Desam Party politicians 
India MPs 1998–1999
India MPs 1999–2004
Lok Sabha members from Andhra Pradesh